Sittingbourne Community F.C. is an English football club located in Sittingbourne, in Kent. The club plays in the Kent County Football League Division Two East. Woodstock Park was accepted into the newly formed Kent Invicta Football League for the inaugural 2011–12 season. They left the league the following season, rejoining the Kent County League. At the start of the 2014–15 season, Woodstock Park entered into an agreement with Sittingbourne (who play their home games at the same ground) to become Sittingbourne Community FC, which now serves as a feeder team to Isthmian League level Sittingbourne.

History
The club was founded as Woodstock Park Football Club in 2002 by Sunday league club Old Oak F.C. who were themselves formed in 1970. The new club entered the Kent County Football League Division Two East and finished runners-up at their first attempt. The club then spent two seasons in Division One East before being relegated back to Division Two. It took them another four seasons to gain promotion again to Division One East when they finished as Runners-up at the end of the 2008–09 season. The club then gained automatic promotion again when they won Division One East, to the Premier Division. For the 2011–12 season the club was accepted into the Kent Invicta Football League at level 10 of the English football league system for the league's inaugural season. However, the following season, the club voluntarily left the Kent Invicta League and rejoined the Kent County League.

Colours
Sittingbourne Community's colours are navy blue shirts, shorts and socks. The away kit is red shirts, shorts and socks.

Ground

Sittingbourne Community play their home games at The W.E.Manin Stadium, Broad Oak Rd, Sittingbourne, ME9 8AG.

Traditionally known as Woodstock Park, the stadium has been renamed The W.E.Manin Stadium as part of a sponsorship deal.

The ground is home to both Sittingbourne Community and Woodstock Sports who play in the Southern Counties East Football League. Originally, the ground was home of Woodstock Park.

Honours

League honours

Kent County League Division One East
Champions (1): 2009–10
Kent County League Division Two East
Runners-up (2): 2002–03, 2008–09

Cup honours
Kent County League Division One East Challenge Cup
Winners (1): 2009–10
Les Leckie Cup
Winners (1): 2009–10
Weald of Kent Charity Senior Cup
Winners (2): 2009–10, 2010–11
Weald of Kent Charity Junior Cup
Winners (3): 2005–06, 2006–07, 2008–09

Records

Highest League Position: 9th in Kent Invicta League 2011–12
Record appearances: Mark Rees with 200 appearances

References

External links

Kent Invicta Football League
Association football clubs established in 2002
2002 establishments in England
Football clubs in England
Sport in Sittingbourne